Scary Movie is a 2000 American slasher parody film directed by Keenen Ivory Wayans and written by Marlon and Shawn Wayans (who both also star), alongside Buddy Johnson, Phil Beauman, Jason Friedberg and Aaron Seltzer. Starring Jon Abrahams, Carmen Electra, Shannon Elizabeth, Anna Faris, Kurt Fuller, Regina Hall, Lochlyn Munro, Cheri Oteri, and Dave Sheridan, it follows a group of teenagers who accidentally hit a man with their car, dump his body in a lake and never talk about it again. A year later, someone wearing a Ghostface mask and robe kills them one by one.

The film is a parody of multiple genres including the horror, slasher, and mystery film genres. Several 1990s films and TV shows are also spoofed, and the script primarily follows the plot of the slasher films Scream and I Know What You Did Last Summer. Some films and TV shows like Halloween, The Shining, Friday the 13th, The Usual Suspects, The Sixth Sense, The Blair Witch Project, and The Matrix, Charlie's Angels, and Buffy the Vampire Slayer were also parodied in some scenes.

Dimension Films released Scary Movie in the United States on July 7. The film grossed $278 million worldwide on a $19 million budget. The film is the first installment in the Scary Movie film series, as well as being the highest grossing film in the series. It later spawned four sequels.

Plot 
On Halloween night, Drew Decker receives a threatening phone call while home alone. Drew is chased outside by somebody dressed as Ghostface, who strips her to her bra and panties before stabbing her in the breast, removing one of her silicone implants. A vehicle driven by her father, who is distracted by receiving fellatio from his wife, hits her, and she looks up to her murderer just before she is stabbed by the killer.

Cindy Campbell meets up with her boyfriend Bobby and her friends, Brenda, Ray, Greg, Shorty and Buffy. Various news teams, including hack reporter Gail Hailstorm, converge on the school in the wake of Drew's murder. Gail hooks up with Buffy's intellectually disabled brother Special Officer Doofy, hoping to milk the facts out of him.

While Cindy is in class, she notices the killer watching her from outside then she receives an ominous note and realizes Drew was murdered exactly one year after she and her friends accidentally killed a man. After football practice, Greg notices a picture of his minuscule genitals on his locker saying "I KNOW" on it. He accuses Ray of taking the picture and nearly fights him. Cindy tells Greg and the others about the note she got and that they need to tell the police but Greg beats her instead telling them to not involve the police, afraid of going to prison for the murder they committed the previous year. At Buffy's beauty pageant that evening, Greg is killed by the killer in plain view while the audience mistakes Buffy's pleas for help as being part of her act of dramatic reading but Buffy wins the pageant, forgetting about Greg.

After Cindy goes home alone, the killer attacks her but retreats when Cindy contacts the police. Bobby arrives and is arrested after a cellphone, knife and gloves fall out of his pocket. As Cindy spends the night at Buffy and Doofy's place, she receives a mocking call from the killer.

The following day, Bobby is released from jail. Buffy is beheaded by the killer with a cleaver, though her severed head keeps talking and is subsequently locked in a lost and found bin. That night, Gail and her cameraman, Kenny, go to Lovers Lookout, a teen makeout spot, to get a murder on camera and films the killer murdering a girl named Heather. The killer then chases Gail and Kenny into the woods and murders Kenny, while Gail gives a snot-filled apology to Kenny's family, a parody of one of the scenes in The Blair Witch Project.

Later that night, Ray and Brenda go to the movie theater to see Shakespeare in Love, where Ray is stabbed through his ear in a bathroom stall while using a glory hole. The killer goes after Brenda but angry movie patrons, who are fed up with Brenda's rude and obnoxious behavior, begin stabbing her to make her stop and also for ruining Shakespeare in Love and several other movies like Thelma & Louise, The Fugitive, Schindler's List, the Jackie Chan movies, Boogie Nights, and Big Momma's House until Brenda drops dead, much to the audience's relief.

Meanwhile, Cindy throws a house party, hoping for safety in numbers. Cindy's friend, Tina goes out to the garage to get more beer but is killed while trying to escape from the killer through a cat flap. During the party, Cindy and Bobby go upstairs and have sex. While in the basement, the killer shows up and gets stoned with Shorty and his friends, but ends up killing all of them except Shorty. After Cindy and Bobby have sex, the killer appears and stabs Bobby before disappearing. Cindy gets a gun from a drawer and Bobby follows. Shorty comes up from the basement, Bobby takes the gun and shoots him. Ray arrives on the scene, still alive.

Bobby and Ray confront Cindy in the kitchen and announce their intention to only kill her and her father, and that they are merely copying the real killer. Bobby admits being gay, while Ray denies being so. The plan backfires when Ray viciously stabs Bobby numerous times, angry because his favorite show, The Wayans Bros., has been canceled. The killer abruptly arrives and stabs Ray. He and Cindy fight, with Cindy employing moves copied from The Matrix and kicking him out a window. However, the killer vanishes before the police arrive.

At the police station, Cindy and the sheriff discover that the killer was not David Keegan, the man whom Cindy and her friends accidentally killed a year earlier and realize that Doofy was the killer the whole time and was faking his disability. Doofy has already escaped with Gail Hailstorm after removing his disguise, a parody of the ending of The Usual Suspects. Upon finding his discarded backpack with his Ghostface mask and sharp knife in the street, Cindy begins screaming but is hit by a car, as the sheriff walks away.

In a mid-credits scene, Shorty is presumably giving advice on how to survive a horror movie but it is actually advice on how to successfully enact a Snatch-and-Run.

In a post-credits scene, Doofy is shown in his bedroom "breaking up" with the vacuum cleaner as though it were a real person with whom he had a relationship.

Cast

Production 

The screenplay was developed by Shawn Wayans and Marlon Wayans with Buddy Johnson and Phil Beauman, writers for the sitcom The Wayans Bros.
At the same time, Miramax was developing a spoof of Scream scripted by Jason Friedberg and Aaron Seltzer. Due to a WGA decision, all six writers were credited, despite Friedberg and Seltzer not actually working on the filmed script.

Anna Faris had graduated from the University of Washington and planned to travel to London, but decided instead to go to Los Angeles and after meeting with some managers auditioned for the film and booked her first acting job. Keenen had rejected many other actresses and was willing to take the chance on Faris despite her lack of experience because of her instinctual performance: "she had this natural innocence and was funny. 
Jenny McCarthy and Melissa Joan Hart auditioned for the part of Drew Decker, before Carmen Electra was cast.

Parodies 
Much of the humor of Scary Movie relies upon specific references to other contemporary films. Roger Ebert remarked in his review that "to get your money's worth, you need to be familiar with the various teenage horror franchises." The two films on which the script is most heavily based are Scream (1996) and I Know What You Did Last Summer (1997) (both written by Kevin Williamson), using the general narrative arcs of both films, and featuring comedic recreations of key scenes. The backstory in which the teenagers are responsible for accidentally killing a man following a beauty pageant recalls the same plot point in I Know What You Did Last Summer. Major references to Scream include the identity of Ghostface and the murder of Drew Decker in the opening scene, a reference to the opening scene of Scream in which the same thing occurs to the character of Casey Becker, played by Drew Barrymore. Additionally, the characters of Scream and I Know What You Did Last Summer are mirrored in the film, and the title "Scary Movie" was originally the working title for the project that would eventually become Scream. At one point the title of this film was going to be "Scream If You Still Know What I Did Last Halloween". Although the Ghostface mask and costume was a replica, the original costume in the Scream series was used when Cindy notices the killer outside of the school.

Many scenes and jokes parody or reference other films outside the horror film genre. The fight between Cindy and the killer heavily mimics The Matrix, particularly its use of bullet time. The final scene, in which Doofy stops feigning his disability and drives away with Gail, is a takeoff of the final scene of The Usual Suspects. When asked about her favorite horror movie, Drew answers "Kazaam" due to Shaquille O'Neal's acting. Cindy becomes aggressive and roars "Say my name!" during sex with Bobby, similar to the sex scene between Michelle and Jim in American Pie. The movie theater scene shows a screening of Shakespeare In Love and a trailer for a fictitious sequel to Amistad titled Amistad II with elements of Titanic also appears in the movie theater scene. When Gail and her cameraman are attacked by the killer, she partakes in a parody of the famous scene in The Blair Witch Project where Heather records an apology to her friends' parents.

The film also makes other pop culture references beyond the scope of film, such as the parodied version of Sarah Michelle Gellar's character Helen Shivers in I Know What You Did Last Summer being named Buffy, which is a reference to her character in Buffy the Vampire Slayer. Others include a brief references to Dawson's Creek, Candid Camera, Big Momma's House, Candyman, Friday the 13th, and a parody of the Whassup? ad campaign by Budweiser.

The tagline for the movie's poster was "No Shame. No Mercy. No Sequel." When Scary Movie 2 was released a year later, the tagline for the sequel was "We Lied."

 Films parodied 
 I Know What You Did Last Summer (1997): Main parody
 Scream (1996): Main parody
 Scream 2 (1997): Brenda's death parodies Maureen Evans' in the opening theater scene, and Cindy's chase scene references CiCi Cooper throwing a bicycle down the stairs, as well as the killer falling over a chair from Sidney Prescott's chase scene.
 Scream 3 (2000): Post video of Shorty giving advice what to do in a sequel.
 The Sixth Sense (1999): Character of Shorty references "I see dead people."
 The Blair Witch Project (1999): Gail Hailstorm references famous "I'm so scared" scene. 
  Halloween (1978): The scene in which Cindy spots the killer outside her classroom window is a direct parody to the scene from "Halloween" in which Laurie Strode first spots Michael Myers outside her classroom window.
 Friday the 13th (1980): Killer says "ch ch ch ah ah ah", a famous sound effect in the Friday the 13th franchise. 
  The Shining (1980): Killer says "Redrum".
  The Matrix (1999): Climax references several fight scenes.
 The Usual Suspects (1995): Ending parodies the twist ending.
 Psycho (1960): Bobby references with the Norman Bates from the movie psycho when he says “we all go a little crazy sometimes”.
 Candyman (1992): Ray tells Cindy that she "branded [Bobby] the Candyman" after Bobby was released from jail.

Music 

The soundtrack to Scary Movie was released on July 4, 2000 through TVT Records and consists of a blend of hip hop and rock music.

 Track listing
 "Too Cool for School"- 2:27 (Fountains of Wayne)
 "The Inevitable Return of the Great White Dope"- 3:53 (Bloodhound Gang) 
 "Stay"- 3:56 (Radford) 
 "The Only Way to Be"- 3:20 (Save Ferris)
 "My Bad"- 3:22 (Oleander) 
 "Punk Song #2"- 2:46 (Silverchair) 
 "Everybody Wants You"- 4:11 (Unband) 
 "Superfly"- 2:55 (Bender) 
 "I Wanna Be Sedated"- 2:31 (The Ramones) 
 "Scary Movies"- 3:56 (Bad Meets Evil)
 "All Bout U"- 4:34 (2Pac, Top Dogg, Yaki Kadafi, Hussein Fatal, Nate Dogg & Dru Down) 
 "I Want Cha"- 4:37 (Black Eyed Peas) 
 "What What"- 5:03 (Public Enemy)
 "Feel Me"- 3:49 (Rah Digga, Rampage & Rock) 
 "I'm the Killer"- 3:57 (Lifelong & Incident)

Reception

Box office 
Scary Movie opened theatrically in the United States on July 7, 2000 on 1,912 screens, and debuted at number one at the box office, earning $42,346,669 its opening weekend. It went on to break Air Force Ones record for having the biggest opening weekend for any R-rated film. The film ultimately grossed $157,019,771 domestically, and earned another $121,000,000 in other markets, making it a massive commercial success.

Critical response 
Scary Movie received mixed reviews from critics. On review aggregator Rotten Tomatoes, the film holds an approval rating of 51% based on 117 reviews, with an average score of 5.50/10. The website's critical consensus reads, "Critics say Scary Movie overloads on crudity and grossness to get its laughs." On Metacritic, the film received a score of 48 based on 32 reviews, indicating "mixed or average reviews". Audiences polled by CinemaScore gave the film an average grade of "B−" on an A+ to F scale.

Joe Leydon of Variety said that the film was "unbounded by taste, inhibition or political correctness" and that "the outer limits of R-rated respectability are stretched, if not shredded". Leydon concludes "Practically guaranteed to make you laugh until you're ashamed of yourself." Roger Ebert gave the film three stars out of four, saying it "delivers the goods", calling the film a "raucous, satirical attack on slasher movies." Ebert was critical of the film for not being as innovative as other films, saying it lacked "the shocking impact of Airplane!, which had the advantage of breaking new ground."

Bob Longino of The Atlanta Journal-Constitution felt that the film's crude humor detracted from the film, saying that Scary Movie "dives so deep into tasteless humor that it's a wonder it landed an R rating instead of an NC-17." Other reviewers, such as A.O. Scott of The New York Times, argued that the jokes were "annoying less for their vulgarity than for their tiredness." Scott remarked "Couch-bound pot smokers, prison sex, mannish female gym teachers, those Whassssup Budweiser commercials—hasn't it all been done to death?"

See also 
 Student Bodies (1981) — A parody of horror movies
 Shriek If You Know What I Did Last Friday the 13th (2000) — A parody of horror movies
 Stan Helsing (2009) — A parody of horror movies
 Fear and Loathing in Las Vegas (1998) — A film which experienced similar issues with WGA crediting dispute.

References

External links 

 
 
 
 

Scary Movie (film series)
2000 films
2000 comedy horror films
2000s American films
2000s English-language films
2000s high school films
2000s parody films
2000s serial killer films
2000s slasher films
2000s teen comedy films
2000s teen horror films
African-American comedy horror films
American comedy horror films
American high school films
American parody films
American serial killer films
American slasher films
American teen comedy films
American teen horror films
Dimension Films films
Films directed by Keenen Ivory Wayans
Films scored by David Kitay
Films set in a movie theatre
Films shot in Vancouver
Miramax films
Parodies of horror
Slasher comedy films
Sororicide in fiction
Stoner films